Super 4 may refer to:

 Super 4 (2014 TV series), a French-German animated television series
 Super 4 (Indian TV series), a Malayalam language musical reality show
 Super 4 (Nigeria), a football competition in Nigeria